Castañón is a surname of Asturian origin.

People with the name
 Antonio Castañón, Mexican businessman
 Jesús Castañón (born 1973), Mexican jockey
 José Manuel Castañón (1920–2001), Spanish writer
 Joseph Castanon (born 1997), American actor and singer-songwriter
 Sofía Castañón (born 1983), Spanish poet and politician

References